The Emai people are a group of people that inhabit a sizable part of Afenmai land in the northwest Edo state of Nigeria. They are a people of Edo extraction currently scattered around the Owan River. Emai territory is bounded on the south by Erah, on the west by Ora, on the east by Ihievbe and on the north by the peoples of Uokha and Ake. All of these groups of people are bounded by ancestry to a common founder, a person called Imah.

Early history and migration
Imah (or Imaran) was believed to be born to an Ubini, Prince Kuoboyuwa, around the fourteenth century AD (circa 1415). His father was the eldest son of Oba Ewuare and heir apparent to the throne.  Young Imah, emotionally shattered by the sudden death of his father, found life miserable in the palace household, and with his grandfather's blessing decided to migrate with his immediate family.

The young troubled prince found a home at Ugboha (a word meaning "near home" or "by the okha tree") close to the present-day ancient town of Uokha.  The Uokha people, also of Ubini extraction, are located near the Kukuruku Hills of what is today Ihievbe-Ogben town close to Edoland. The area is believed to have been unclaimed and uninhabited at that period of time. Amidst this thickly dense forestation Imah made a home for his family. It came to be called Eko-Imah or Ehe-Imah which means "Imah's camp" or "Imah's place."  Over time this was corrupted to Emai (meaning "our own" or "our land is good").

At one time the place was dominated by the okha trees common in the Nigerian Guinea savannah belt. Imah is said to have been cured mysteriously by one of these trees when he was ill, thus giving the town of Uokha its name. This is the origin of the Eseokhai festival, commemorating the trees that had given Imah both refuge on his journey and a cure for his ailment.

Imah was survived by a son, Uzuanbi. In his old age Imah decided to return to the land of his ancestors in Ubini, leaving Uzuanbi and his family behind. Shortly afterward, word reached Uzuanbi of the death of his father in Ubini. This forced Uzuanbi to return to Ubini to perform his father's burial rites. On the completion of these rites he returned with two wives, Odidi and Oron. While Odidi had three children, Oron was reportedly barren. The children of Odidi were Owunno, Oruamen and Urle.

Today the people of Emai occupy the towns of Uanhumi, Ovbiwun, Afuze, Eteye, Ogute, Evbiamen, Evbiamen Ugboha, Okpohunmi, Ojavun and Ojavun-Ago. Due to the need for expansion and the growing population of the Emai people they were forced to move southward, which resulted in clashes with neighboring clans. An example is the famous skirmish with the people of Erah which ensued in a war; this memory remains as the famous war of "Ogodo bi Isagua" (meaning "war of mud and death") which forced the Erah people to move further south. This war was mainly fought by the descendants of Urle and Erah while the movement of Ogute from Emai-Ugbowa led to the expulsion of the Uhonmora Ora peoples and the founding of Ogute and Ago Ojavun to the Eme-ora borders.

Emai kingship and leadership
In keeping with Benin traditions, the people of Emai had the "odion evbo," which was the oldest man from the oldest town (Uanhumi) to be their king. The discussion of the leadership tussle also throws more light upon the population increase and the reason why there was subsequent migration from Ugbokha.

During the burial rites of his father in Ubini, it is believed that Uzuanbi had an affair with the wife of another man and she bore a male son who was in fact his eldest child. This child suffered considerable hostilities as regards acceptability and difficulty in effectively winning the leadership support of Owunno, whose descendants are today Evbiamen, Okpohumi and Ojavun. He left his descendants to be supported only by Urle, who are today Eteye and Afuze. This would make the people of Uanhumi, Afuze and Eteye to be the first to leave the parent settlement of Emai-Ugbowa.

The reason for the skirmish was the fact that Owunno refused to accept the seniority of Uanhumi who was supported by his brother Urle. This is the reason why Uanhumi and the people of Urle had to leave and remained close to each other.

Traditionally, the oldest man in Uanhumi is the Ode of Emai Regent King and is known to choose his speaker or prime minister from Uze, a tradition that existed till the late 18th century. Due to the emergence of colonial rule and the use of traditional rulers as district officers for the purposes of tax collection by the British colonial government, the prime minister usurped the position of Ode  of Emai from Uanhumi, which was presumably weak and small in size at the time.

Since every town had its cults regarding the rights to ascension of positions, this right was at that time left exclusively to Uanhumi, but today the descendants of Urle of the Uze (now called "Afuze") and Eteye lineage have succeeded in ruling effectively. Though the most revered and oldest of deities is still at Uanhumi, the throne was lost to the Afuze who have produced four heirs to the throne as Oloje of Emai.

The people of Ovbiowun to this day have a parallel kingship known as Oloje of Ovbiowun and celebrate their separate festival of Ese-Okhai, meaning "benefits from the okah tree."

Today there exists only one way to have common consensus: if only the powerful rulers of Urle and the rest of Emai are magnanimous enough to unite the Eije Cult (the cult of chiefs) with the aim of a single ruling hierarchy. This remains to be seen. The right to kingship is extended to all male children at birth who are unarguably descendants of Imah and are capable of obeying and participating in the princely duties of the Eije Cults.

Last three Olojes (kings)
OGEDENGBE I
OJEALARO I
EMAI DE LIGT

Language
The language of the Emai finds most of its words from its parent Benin language of Edoid classification and the neighboring tribes of Ora, Ihievbe, Uokha and Yoruba.

Common greetings
Ese – Hello
Edioo – Good Morning (by men)
Laoba – Good Morning (by women)
Edi – Good Day
Osen chian – Goodbye
Amiegbe – So Long
Ochian ahor – See you tomorrow or Good night
Iso Iso – Ese Okhai festival greeting, meaning "I have survived"

Emai beliefs and culture
The Emai people practice animism and indigenous worship of ancestors, as well as Christianity.

Festivals
Oghae - children age group
Eseokhai - traditional new year
Aovbukpode - adult age group
Oimiyan - masquerade festival

Emai contributions to Nigeria
Emai is the dominant tribe in Owan East Local Government Area of Edo State Nigeria. It has produced leaders for Nigeria and Edo in all spheres of life, including education, politics, health care, industry and the Nigerian armed forces.

Emai people abroad
Many Emai citizens live abroad in countries such as the United States, countries in Europe, and other parts of the globe.

Emai children have various unions. They include Emai union worldwide with branches in Lagos, Gothenburg, London and New York City and other umbrella organizations.

Emai people are specific to the Coventry Group area of Mount Redcliffe whereby their illustrious leader Col. Finny Finster rules them harshly with a big stick. Changes are imminent though, for Col. Finster is due to take a leave of absence in order to cleanse the demon Koo-ndo-ola from his midst.

References

External links
Emai People of Edo State by Wilson Oifovbotoi Onime
Edo People By PRINCE Ademola Iyi Eweka

Ethnic groups in Nigeria
Edo State